Joaquín Eufrasio Guzmán (Cartago, Costa Rica, 15 February 1801 –  San Miguel, El Salvador, 1875) was a Central American politician and military general who served as acting President of El Salvador on three occasions: from 25 October 1844 to 16 February 1845, from 25 April 1845 to 1 February 1846, and from 19 January 1859 to 15 February 1859, after conducting a coup against General Francisco Malespín after the Guerra de Malespín, an invasion into Nicaragua which he solely started to loot the Nicaraguan metropolis of León.

Early life and family 
Guzmán was born in Cartago, Costa Rica, in 1801 into a landowning family. In the dissensions between the Federal and Centralist parties, Guzmán joined the former. A landowner, he was commissioned as a lieutenant-colonel.

He had married and had a family. His son David Joaquín Guzmán was a politician and doctor, founding director of the National Museum of El Salvador and a museum of anthropology in Nicaragua.

Political career

Coup d'etat 

He was elected Vice President of El Salvador in 1844 with General Francisco Malespin as president. That year Malespin invaded Nicaragua and left the capital to command the army in person and handed over power to Guzmán.

Guzmán conducted a coup against Malespin on 2 February 1845 and was joined by the greater part of the inhabitants of the capital, and a portion of the general's small army. They deposed Malespin and Guzmán assumed the executive office till the end of the presidential term.

Malespín's Invasion 
Backed by a force from Honduras, Malespin invaded El Salvador but was defeated and assassinated. Guzmán was rewarded by the Assembly with the rank of general of division. He favored free elections and in 1848 delivered the office to his successor, Aguilar.

Later political career 
Guzmán was several times elected to the legislative assembly, the council of state, and the prefecture of the department where he resided.

He was later elected as Vice President of El Salvador alongside President Miguel Santín del Castillo, and served from February 1858 to February 1859.

Death 
He died in 1875, San Miguel, El Salvador.

References

Presidents of El Salvador
1801 births
1875 deaths
People from Cartago Province
Vice presidents of El Salvador
Members of the Legislative Assembly of El Salvador
Leaders who took power by coup
Salvadoran military personnel
Date of birth missing
Date of death missing